
Disqualifications in tennis can occur for unsporting conduct.

ATP rules state that:
Players shall not at any time physically abuse any official, opponent, spectator or other person within the precincts of the tournament site. For purposes of this rule, physical abuse is the unauthorized touching of an official, opponent, and spectator or other person.

Disqualified players

See also
Unsportsmanlike conduct
List of tennis code violations

References

Sports penalties
Tennis terminology